Leslie Korkie (born 29 August 1969) is a South African former cricketer who played as a right-handed batter. She appeared in seven One Day Internationals for South Africa between 1997 and 1999. She played domestic cricket for Free State.

References

External links
 
 

1969 births
Living people
Cricketers from Bloemfontein
South African women cricketers
South Africa women One Day International cricketers
Free State women cricketers
20th-century South African women
21st-century South African women